Thalassoma heiseri is a species of wrasse native to the Pacific waters around the Tuamotus and Pitcairn Island, where it inhabits reefs.

References

heiseri
Fish described in 1984